Anda-Louise Bogza (born February 21, 1965) is a celebrated Romanian opera soprano. In 1994, she won both the First Prize and the Audience Prize at the Vienna International Singing Competition. In 2007, she was honored with the Thalia Award.

Biography
Born in Piatra Neamț, Anda-Louise Bogza studied music at the George Enescu Conservatory in Iași, the National University of Music Bucharest, and at the Academy of Performing Arts in Prague (piano, singing, and harpsichord). She began her career performing at the State Opera and the National Theatre in Prague. She remains committed to both of those houses to this day. Among the roles which she has portrayed in Prague are Abigaille in Nabucco, Amelia in Un ballo in maschera, Donna Anna in Don Giovanni, Desdemona in Otello, Elisabetta in Don Carlo, Giorgetta in Il Tabarro Katerina in Káťa Kabanová, Leonora in Il Trovatore, Lisa in Pique Dame, Minnie in La Fanciulla del West, Sina in Hans Krása's Verlobung im Traum, and the title roles in Aida, Jenůfa, Manon Lescaut, Tosca, and Turandot.

Bogza maintains an active international career as a freelance artist. She has sung Aida at the Vienna State Opera, the Berlin State Opera, the Deutsche Oper Berlin, and the Leipzig Opera. She has portrayed Tosca at the Maggio Musicale Fiorentino, the Bavarian State Opera, Oper Frankfurt, Grand Théâtre de Bordeaux, the New Israeli Opera, the Grand Théâtre de Luxembourg, the Slovak National Theatre, in Japan, the Romanian National Opera, and at the Salzburg Festival. Another signature role, Leonora in Il Trovatore, has brought her to the stages of the Hamburg State Opera, the Hungarian State Opera, the Royal Danish Theatre, the Teatro de la Maestranza, and to opera houses in the United States. She has also sung at Suntory Hall in Tokyo and Opéra de Marseille. In 2005 she made her first appearance at the Opéra National de Paris in the title role of Dvořák's Rusalka.
 
Bogza currently resides in the Czech Republic. In the 2009–2010 season she was scheduled to sing Donna Anna and Aida in Prague and Abigaille at the National Theatre Brno.

Repertoire
Bogza's repertoire includes the following:
 Arrigo Boito: Mefistofele – Elena
 Arrigo Boito: Nerone – Asteria
 Antonín Dvořák: Rusalka – Rusalka
 Antonín Dvořák: Rusalka – Foreign Princess
 Gottfried von Einem: Der Prozeß – Fräulein Bürstner
 Umberto Giordano: Andrea Chénier – Maddalena di Coigny
 Leoš Janáček: Jenůfa – Jenůfa
 Leoš Janáček: Katya Kabanova – Katia
 Hans Krása: Verlobung im Traum – Sina
 Pietro Mascagni: Cavalleria rusticana – Santuzza 
 Wolfgang Amadeus Mozart: Don Giovanni – Donna Anna
 Wolfgang Amadeus Mozart: Le Nozze di Figaro – The Countess
 Jacques Offenbach: Les Contes d'Hoffman – Giulietta
 Giacomo Puccini: La fanciulla del West – Minnie
 Giacomo Puccini: Manon Lescaut – Manon 
 Giacomo Puccini: La rondine – Magda
 Giacomo Puccini: Il tabarro – Giorgetta
 Giacomo Puccini: Tosca – Tosca
 Giacomo Puccini: Turandot – Liù  
 Giacomo Puccini: Turandot – Turandot 
 Richard Strauss: Salome – Salome
 Pyotr Ilyich Tchaikovsky: The Queen of Spades – Lisa
 Giuseppe Verdi: Aida – Aida
 Giuseppe Verdi: Un ballo in maschera – Amelia
 Giuseppe Verdi: Don Carlos – Elisabetta
 Giuseppe Verdi: La forza del destino – Leonora
 Giuseppe Verdi: Macbeth – Lady Macbeth
 Giuseppe Verdi: Nabucco – Abigaille
 Giuseppe Verdi: Otello –  Desdemona
 Giuseppe Verdi: Il trovatore –  Leonora
 Richard Wagner: Lohengrin –  Elsa
 Richard Wagner: Tannhäuser – Elisabeth

References

External links 
Official website – Anda-Louise Bogza – Opera Singer – in English, Czech, Italian, and Romanian
Anda-Louise Bogza – OPERISSIMO
 Anda-Louise Bogza – Soloist of the State Opera and the National Theatre in Prague
Singer Anda-Louise Bogza and her profile. Overview of upcoming and passed concerts
article – Hudební Rozhledy (III. Aby se vědělo – Anda-Louise Bogza)
article – Xantypa (ANDA-LOUISE BOGZA – operní zpěvačka)
article - Scena.cz – 1. kulturní portál (Anda-Louise Bogza: Toscu jsem interpretovala 250 krát…)
article – Opera + (Anda-Louise Bogza: Pro mne je Praha stále srdcem Evropy)
Anda-Louise Bogza: Považuji Prahu za svůj druhý domov - Scena.cz – 1. kulturní portál
Anda–Louise Bogza: Pro těch pár okamžiků…
Anda–Louise Bogza, operní pěvkyně
Anda-Louise Bogza – Divadelní festival Opava DiFeO 2016 - STYLEnew.cz
Anda-Louise Bogza – Hudební Rozhledy
Anda–Louise Bogza – Slovenské národné divadlo
Von der Selbstapotheose zur Anbetung des unsichtbaren Gottes – Giuseppe Verdis Oper "Nabucco" im Bukarester Opernhaus – Allgemeine Deutsche Zeitung für Rumänien
ONB: Anda-Louise Bogza, în spectacolul 'Nabucco'; Maria Slătinaru Nistor, sărbătorită la aniversare – Agerpres
Soprana Anda-Louise Bogza, laureata a Concursului International de Canto de la Viena, canta pe scena Operei Nationale Bucuresti
Anda-Louise Bogza – O mare artistă, onorată de Opera Națională București – Q Magazine
Prim-solista Operei din Praga, Anda-Louise Bogza, nerabdatoare sa revina la Sibiu – SibiuNews
Anda-Louise Bogza – Din nou la Piatra, acasă... – Mesagerul de Neamț
Mari ambasadori ai României peste hotare: Anda-Louise Bogza – ZCH NEWS 
Vocea unei românce cucerește Arenele din Verona – Q Magazine
Romanca Anda-Louise Bogza "cap de afis" pe scenele lumii – Curierul Național
Anda-Louise Bogza, pe scena Operei Naţionale Greacă din Atena – Radio România Muzical 
Soprana Anda-Louise Bogza: „Contactul cu publicul este benefic pentru mine!” - Lirika.ro
Aplecare asupra sufletului – interviu cu Anda-Louise Bogza – Mesagerul de Neamț
Anda-Louise Bogza – Enciclopedia Muzicală a României

1965 births
Living people
People from Piatra Neamț
National University of Music Bucharest alumni
Academy of Performing Arts in Prague alumni
Romanian operatic sopranos
Romanian expatriates in the Czech Republic
Recipients of the Thalia Award